Indian gauge is a broad track gauge of , used in India, Pakistan, western Bangladesh, Sri Lanka, Argentina, Chile, and on BART in San Francisco, United States.

In North America, it is called Indian Gauge, Provincial, Portland, or Texas gauge. In Argentina and Chile, it is known as "trocha ancha" (Spanish for broad gauge). In the Indian subcontinent it is simply known as "broad gauge". Elsewhere it is known as Indian gauge. It is the widest gauge in regular passenger use anywhere in the world.

Asia

India

In India, the initial freight railway lines were built using standard gauge. This was then adopted as the standard for the nationwide network.

Indian Railways today predominantly operates on  broad gauge. Most of the metre gauge and narrow gauge railways have been converted to broad gauge. Small stretches of the network that remain on metre and narrow gauges are also being converted to broad gauge. Rapid transit lines are mostly on standard gauge, although some initial lines use  broad gauge.

Bangladesh

Bangladesh Railways uses a mix of  broad gauge and metre gauge. The broad gauge network is primarily located to the west of the Jamuna River, while the metre gauge network is primarily located to its east. The Jamuna Bridge is a mixed-use bridge that contains a dual gauge connection across the river linking both networks.

Nepal

In Nepal, all services currently operate on  broad gauge only.

Pakistan

In Pakistan, all services currently operate on  broad gauge only.

Sri Lanka

In Sri Lanka, all services currently operate on  broad gauge only.

Europe

United Kingdom
The  broad gauge was first used in Scotland for two short, isolated lines, the Dundee and Arbroath Railway (1836-1847) and the Arbroath and Forfar Railway (1838-). Both the lines were subsequently converted to standard gauge.

Spain and Portugal
Used rolling stock from Iberia has been employed on broad-gauge lines in Argentina and Chile.

North America

Canada

Canada became the first British colony, in the 1850s, to use  broad gauge. It was known as the "Provincial gauge" in Canada.

The Grand Trunk Railway which operated in several Canadian provinces (Quebec and Ontario) and American states (Connecticut, Maine, Massachusetts, New Hampshire, and Vermont) used it, but was changed to standard gauge in 1873. The Grand Trunk Railway operated from headquarters in Montreal, Quebec, although corporate headquarters were in London, England. The St. Lawrence and Atlantic Railroad which operated in Quebec, Vermont, New Hampshire and Maine also used it but was converted in 1873.

There is a longstanding rumour that the Provincial gauge was selected specifically to create a break-of-gauge with US railways, the War of 1812 still being a fresh memory. However, there is little supporting evidence for this, and this story appears to be traced to a single claim from the late 1800s.

United States

The original engineers chose the wide gauge for its "great stability and smoother riding qualities" and intended to make a state-of-the-art system for other municipalities to emulate. The use of  broad gauge rails was one of many unconventional design elements included in its design which, in addition to its unusual gauge, also used flat-edge rail, rather than typical rail that angles slightly inward (although the shape of BART wheels and rail has been modified since then). This has complicated maintenance of the system, as it requires custom wheelsets, brake systems, and track maintenance vehicles.

The New Orleans, Opelousas and Great Western Railroad (NOO&GW) used  broad gauge until 1872, and the Texas and New Orleans Railroad used  broad gauge ("Texas gauge") until 1876. The Grand Trunk Railway predecessor St. Lawrence and Atlantic Railroad which operated in Quebec, Vermont, New Hampshire and Maine also used  broad gauge ("Canadian gauge", "Provincial gauge" or "Portland gauge") but was converted in 1873.  Several Maine railroads connected to the Grand Trunk Railway shared its "Portland Gauge".  The Androscoggin and Kennebec Railroad and the Buckfield Branch Railroad were later consolidated as the Maine Central Railroad which converted to standard gauge in 1871. 
John A. Poor's chief engineer Alvin C. Morton compiled the following advantages of "Portland Gauge" for Maine railways in 1847:
 Frost heaves (swelling of wet soil upon freezing) produce an uneven running surface causing an irregular rocking motion as trains moved past.  A wider wheelbase offered a steadier ride with less wear on the machinery and roadbed.
 Wider cars offered more room for passengers and cargo.  Train length would be reduced for cars carrying the same amount of cargo. Shorter trains would lessen the effects of side winds, and permit more efficient application of power.
 Wide gauge locomotives offered more room to place reciprocating machinery inside, rather than outside the driving wheels.  Reciprocating machinery was a source of vibration before mechanical engineering encompassed a good understanding of dynamics; and keeping such vibration close to the center of mass reduced the angular momentum causing rocking.
 Wider fireboxes and boilers allowed more powerful locomotives. The alternative of longer boilers held the disadvantage of poor firebox draft through the increased frictional resistance of longer boiler tubes.
 More powerful locomotives carrying fewer, larger cars would have reduced manpower requirement for engine crews and shop personnel.
 For locomotives of equal power, fuel consumption increased as gauge decreased, especially in colder outside temperatures.
 More powerful wide gauge locomotives would be more capable for plowing snow; and thereby provide more reliable winter service.
 Several gauges were in widespread use, and none had yet come into clear dominance.
 Freight transfer was preferable to exchange of cars between railways because unowned cars were abused on foreign railways.
 The Grand Trunk Railway system feeding the seaport of Portland, Maine offered little need for gauge transfer prior to loading on export shipping.
 Potential advantages of freight transfer to the standard gauge railroad from Portland to Boston seemed insignificant as long as competitive rates were available for transport on steamships between the two ports.
 The majority of Canadian freight anticipated to be carried over rail lines to Portland was heavy and bulky in comparison to its value, and must be transported cheaply in large quantities to maintain profitability for producers and transporters.

South America

Argentina

The national railway network is predominantly on  broad gauge.

Chile

Most links of  broad gauge railways are in the center-south of the country. On the contrary, just a few branches of the FCN (Ferrocarril del Norte) were broad gauge, most notably the Mapocho-Puerto mainline between Santiago and Valparaiso, the Santiago–Valparaíso railway line. This link was directly connected to the southern railroad network using the Matucana tunnel that connected Mapocho and the Central Station in Santiago. The Transandine Railway that connected both Argentinean and Chilean broad gauge networks through the Uspallata pass in the Andes mountains was actually a  narrow gauge link.

Similar gauges and compatibility

The Iberian gauge is closely similar to the Indian gauge, with only  difference, and allows compatibility with the rolling stock. For example, in recent years Chile and Argentina have bought second hand Spanish/Portuguese Iberian-gauge rolling stock. 1,668 mm trains can run on 1,676 mm gauge without adaptation, but for better stability in high-speed running a wheelset replacement  may be required (for example, Russian-Finnish train Allegro has  gauge, intermediate between Russian   and Finnish  ). Backward compatibility—1,676 mm trains on 1,668 mm gauge—is possible, but no examples and data exist. Due to the narrower gauge, a strong wear of wheelsets may occur without replacement.

Operational railways

Closed railways

See also

Broad-gauge railway
Heritage railway
List of track gauges

References

Track gauges by name